Canon Inc. has produced seven different 24mm lenses for its Canon EF and EF-S lens mounts.  Three have been discontinued after updated replacements were announced.

 EF 24mm 1.4L USM, introduced December 1997. (discontinued in 2008, replaced by EF 24mm 1.4L II USM)
 EF 24mm 1.4L II USM, introduced December 2008.
 EF 24mm 2.8, introduced November 1988. (discontinued in 2012, replaced by EF 24 2.8 IS USM)
 EF 24mm 2.8 IS USM, announced February 2012, available since June 2012.
 EF-S 24mm 2.8 STM, announced September 2014. Unlike the other 24mm lenses, it will mount only on bodies that support the EF-S mount. It will mount on all current Canon DSLR bodies with APS-C sensors, as well as older APS-C bodies dating to the 2003 introduction of the EF-S mount (in other words, the EOS 10D and older bodies are not compatible). It will not mount on any DSLR body with a full-frame or APS-H sensor. It also cannot directly mount on Canon's mirrorless bodies (either the APS-C EF-M mount or the full-frame RF mount), but the company sells adapters that allow EF-S lenses to be used on either mirrorless mount. As it is designed for Canon APS-C bodies, its field of view is equivalent to a 38mm lens on a full-frame sensor, and operates similar to the Canon EF 40mm f/2.8 STM pancake lens. Compared to the EF 24 2.8 IS USM, the EF-S lens loses IS, but lists for about a fourth of the price. The STM offers advantages for video shooting over USM, specifically quieter autofocus.
 TS-E 24mm 3.5L, introduced April 1991. (discontinued, replaced by TS-E 24mm 3.5L II)
 TS-E 24mm 3.5L II, introduced June 2009.

Specifications of the EF 24mm lenses

References

External links

Canon EF lenses